Walter Dennis Skidmore (November 19, 1903 – April 13, 1993) was an American basketball coach.  he was best known for being the head coach of the North Carolina Tar Heels men's basketball team from 1935 through 1939.  Skidmore had a record of 65–25 with the Tar Heels and led his team to win the Southern Conference Tournament in 1936 and Southern Conference regular season championship in 1938.  In his last year of coaching, Skidmore coached George Glamack who went on to become a star player at North Carolina. Skidmore took over coaching after Bo Shepard left as head coach due to health problems. Skidmore was a native of Harlan County, Kentucky, and the son of a coal miner.  He attended Centre College in Kentucky, graduating in 1926.  Before becoming the head basketball coach at North Carolina, Skidmore had coached the North Carolina junior varsity and Charlotte High School teams.  He retired from coaching in 1939 and moved to Letcher County, Kentucky.  From 1955 to 1970, Skidmore operated the Tar Heel Motel in Clinton, North Carolina.  In April 1993, Skidmore died in Chapel Hill, North Carolina, at age 89.

Head coaching record

References
General

 
 
 
 

Specific

1903 births
1993 deaths
American men's basketball coaches
Basketball coaches from Kentucky
High school basketball coaches in the United States
North Carolina Tar Heels men's basketball coaches
People from Chapel Hill, North Carolina
Centre College alumni
People from Clinton, North Carolina